Microdrillia stephensensis is a species of sea snail, a marine gastropod mollusk in the family Borsoniidae.

Description

Distribution
This marine species is endemic to Australia and occurs off New South Wales.

References

 Laseron, C. 1954. Revision of the New South Wales Turridae (Mollusca). Australian Zoological Handbook. Sydney : Royal Zoological Society of New South Wales 1–56, pls 1–12.

External links
  Bouchet P., Kantor Yu.I., Sysoev A. & Puillandre N. (2011) A new operational classification of the Conoidea. Journal of Molluscan Studies 77: 273–308
 

stephensensis
Gastropods of Australia
Gastropods described in 1954
Endemic fauna of Australia
Fauna of New South Wales